The 1992 Cronulla-Sutherland Sharks season was the 26th in the club's history. They competed in the NSWRL's 1992 Winfield Cup premiership.

Ladder

Gold Coast Seagulls were docked 2 points due to exceeding the replacement limit in one game.

References

Cronulla-Sutherland Sharks seasons
Cronulla-Sutherland Sharks season